The Organization for Respect and Care for Animals ( / ), or ORCA, is a civil society organization that helps people care for nature and animal welfare in order to achieve personal, economic and social development. The group aims to fulfill their mission in Serbia and the Western Balkans through advocacy, research, and education, as well as by monitoring policies and regulations. The purpose of ORCA's advocacy is to effect the enforcement and adoption of better policies and to improve society's attitude towards nature and animals.

ORCA was formed by a group of enthusiasts from the Faculty of Veterinary Medicine in Belgrade on November 28, 2000. Today ORCA is a well known civil society organization and a member of some of  the most significant animal welfare groups in the world:

 Species Survival Network - SSN 
 CEEweb for Biodiversity 
 European Commission Expert Group Platform on Animal Welfare
 European Forum on Nature Conservation and Pastoralism- EFNCP
 EUROBATS Advisory Committee
 Eurogroup for Animals

Summary of priorities and efforts 
ORCA focuses its efforts on:

 ANIMALS, that deserve to live life free of pain, suffering and stress caused by humans
 NATURE, which provides food, water, fertile soil and other resources that everyone is equally entitled to
 PEOPLE and their well-being, which depends on environmental conservation and animal welfare

Together with its partners and donors, ORCA advocates for the improvement of legislation and the reinforcement of existing practices. Projects include:

 Nature conservation in agriculture. ORCA is the leading partner in the regional consortium to assist the Western Balkans countries in developing environmental conservation and animal welfare policies within agricultural landscapes.
 Enforcement of legislation. ORCA pioneered the work of the Coordination body for the enforcement of legislation related to environmental protection and animal welfare.
 ORCA farm animal welfare standards. ORCA works to improve food quality and safety, consumer rights and the economic interests of farmers by improving welfare standards for farm animals 
 ORCA model 'For people and dogs'. ORCA advocates for local municipalities and cities to apply ORCA's unique model for permanent and humane solutions to the issue of abandoned dogs, based on standards set by the World Organisation for Animal Health (OEI)
 Prevention and protection from violence. ORCA has provided expertise in support of the initiative to recognize violence against animals as part of societal violence and to have it be included in strategies, legislation and protocols for authorities in charge of prevention of violence and protection of victims of violence. 
 Animal protection in Criminal act. ORCA advocates for changes of the Criminal Act towards considering animal abandonment to be a criminal act as well as making it so that abusive owners could have their animals taken away and be forbidden from keeping animals in the future.
 Constitution and animals. ORCA has collected over 100,000 signatures from citizens for its initiative to include animal welfare in the Constitution of the Republic of Serbia.
 Children's club ORkiCA. A place to learn and grow: a place where children can socialize, play and explore in a safe and inspiring environment while being assisted by professional educators. Over 5,000 children have participated in these workshops.
 ORCA Scholar. A program that gathers young professionals, biologists, animal husbandry engineers, veterinarians, legal experts, sociologists, psychologists, teachers, pedagogues – anybody who wants to widen and deepen their knowledge of environmental protection and animal welfare. ORCA provides support and resources for students working on research papers and graduate work, as well as masters and PhD theses.

What ORCA has done 
Since its inception, ORCA has striven to bring attention to the importance of environmental conservation and animal welfare by frequently working with government agencies, communicating with citizens and running media campaigns. Some of ORCA's works include:

 Legislation. ORCA has drafted an animal welfare law which has since been implemented. This Law provides the basis for the welfare of all animals that are dependent on human care and represents the turning point in the relationship between humans and animals in Serbia.
 Developing awareness on importance of protecting animal welfare. As a result of the 'ORCA Education' program, preschool and elementary school students in Serbia have a chance to learn what animal welfare is and how it can be protected.
 10 ORCA protocols used by veterinary inspectors to assess the welfare of farm animals. The protocols contain animal focused measures and are based on observing the behavior of animals, as well as their physical and psychological state (in addition to the environment in which animal lives). Serbia is the first country in Europe to officially implement these protocols.
 Stricter conservation regime for bobcats through advocating for state authorities to take an active part in the conservation of endangered wild animal and plant species at the Conference of Parties to CITES convention.
 Making the abuse, murder, and forced fighting of animals criminal acts punishable by prison sentence in Serbia and Montenegro.
 Providing support to the development of CSOs. As leaders of the regional consortium, ORCA provides support to CSOs and grants their advocacy projects in the area of sustainable agriculture and environmental protection in Serbia, Albania, Montenegro and Macedonia.

Other projects:

 Project "I’m not a stray, I’m abandoned" (2003.) funded by the World Society for the Protection of Animals (WSPA).
 Project "Animals in focus" (2005.), funded by The Royal Society for the Prevention of Cruelty to Animals (RSPCA).
 Project "Info center for animal protection“ (2007.), funded by the City of Belgrade.
 Project "Education and teaching on animal welfare – for humans, animals and environment" (2009.), funded by USAID.
 Project "e-CEETES: e-Trade monitoring of wildlife in Central and Eastern Europe" (2011.), funded by the International Fund for Animal Welfare IFAW.
 Project "Animal welfare standards” (2012.), funded by the EU.
 Project "Bat conservation in agricultural landscapes" (2013.), funded by the Rufford Foundation.
 Project “Welfare for all” (2014.), funded by the EU and Austrian Development Agency.
 Project "Sustainable agriculture for sustainable Balkans" (2016.), funded by the EU.

References

External links
ORCA - official website Serbia

2000 establishments in Serbia
Animal welfare organizations based in Serbia